Jeff Tymoschuk is a Canadian composer who writes music for film, television, video games and theatrical productions. His music is often fast-paced and intense to accompany lively action sequences.

Early life
Tymoschuk grew up in Souris, Manitoba.

Career
In 2002, Tymoschuk wrote the musical score for the video game James Bond 007: Nightfire from Electronic Arts. He later composed additional music on James Bond 007: Everything or Nothing, supplementing composer Sean Callery’s score.

Tymoschuk has also written music for Pursuit Force: Extreme Justice for BigBig Games/Sony Computer Entertainment Europe, Penny Arcade Adventures: On the Rain-Slick Precipice of Darkness and DeathSpank from Hothead Games, and additional music on The Simpsons Hit and Run for Radical Entertainment/Vivendi Universal Games.  In 2011, he composed the score for Sleeping Dogs from United Front Games, an open world game set in the Hong Kong underworld.

In 2010, he composed the score for the supernatural thriller Altitude for director Kaare Andrews and Foundation Features, starring Jessica Lowndes and Julianna Guill. Other films include Below Zero, starring Edward Furlong and Michael Berryman, and the action/horror film Tasmanian Devils, starring Danica McKellar.

Tymoschuk has created sound and music for a number of theatrical productions at the Carousel Theatre for Young People in Vancouver.  In 2012, he was nominated for a Jessie Richardson Theatre Award for composition.

Film

Television

Video games

References

External links
Official homepage
GameSetWatch Interview

1974 births
Living people
Video game composers
Canadian people of Ukrainian descent